The 2018 Kremlin Cup was an international professional ten-ball pool tournament held between 17 and 21 September in Moscow, Russia.

Niels Feijen defeated Alexander Kazakis in the final 8–7.

References

2018 in cue sports
Kremlin World Cup
Kremlin World Cup
Kremlin Cup (pool)